Gabriel Auguste François Marty (18 May 1904 – 16 February 1994) was a French Catholic  cardinal and Archbishop of Paris.

Early years
He was born in Vaureilles, Pachins, in France. His family were farmers. His first baptismal forename was Gabriel but used another baptismal name, François, so as to avoid confusion with a classmate (no relation) who was also named Gabriel Marty. Educated at the Seminary of Rodez and the Catholic Institute of Toulouse, he received ordination to the priesthood on 28 June 1930, in Rodez. He worked as a pastor in the diocese of Rodez from 1930 until 1951, and then served as vicar general of the diocese to 1952.

Episcopate

Pope Pius XII appointed him bishop of Saint-Flour on 1 February 1952. He was promoted to be titular Archbishop of Emesa and appointed Coadjutor Archbishop of Reims. He succeeded to the metropolitan see of Reims on 9 May 1960. As Archbishop of Reims he attended the Second Vatican Council. He was elected Vice-president of the Episcopal Conference of France from 31 May 1966 to 26 May 1969 and was then elected its president, serving until 24 October 1975. He was transferred to the metropolitan see of Paris 26 March 1968.

Cardinalate
He was created a cardinal and appointed Cardinal-Priest of San Luigi dei Francesi by Pope Paul VI in the consistory of 28 April 1969. He took part in the conclaves that elected Pope John Paul I and Pope John Paul II. He resigned the pastoral government of the archdiocese, 31 January 1981. He lost the right to participate in any further conclaves when turned 80 years of age in 1984. He died on 16 February 1994 in a car and train accident.

References

External links
 http://www.catholic-hierarchy.org/bishop/bmartyf.html

1904 births
1994 deaths
People from Aveyron
20th-century French cardinals
Participants in the Second Vatican Council
Archbishops of Paris
Archbishops of Reims
Bishops of Saint-Flour
Cardinals created by Pope Paul VI
Road incident deaths in France